Thula or Thila is a town in west-central Yemen. It is located in the 'Amran Governorate.

Thula is one of five towns in Yemen on the UNESCO World Heritage Tentative List. Dating to the Himyarite period, the town is very well preserved and includes traditional houses and mosques. Archaeological investigation discovered Sabaean period ruins with massive stone architecture beneath the Himyarite. Restoration between 2004 and 2011, restored the Bab al Mayah gate, several
watch towers, paths, the traditional cistern, and other portions of the Sabaean fort.

World Heritage Status
This site was added to the UNESCO World Heritage Tentative List on July 8, 2002, in the Cultural category.

Gallery

See also
Thula District

References

External links
Towns and villages in the Amran

Populated places in 'Amran Governorate

Towns in Yemen